Arne Toonen (born 9 January 1975) is a Dutch film director. Several of his films won the Golden Film and Platinum Film awards.

Career 

In 2010, he directed the film Dik Trom. The film won both the Golden Film and Platinum Film awards. The film also won the Golden Calf for Best Production Design award at the 2011 Netherlands Film Festival.

His short film Drop Dead won the Competition for the Short Film Award at the Osnabrück Independent Film Festival. In 2012, he directed the film Black Out. In 2015, he directed the film The Little Gangster (De Boskampi's). The film won the Michel Award at the 2015 Filmfest Hamburg.

In 2019, he directed the film Amsterdam Vice (Baantjer: Het Begin) based on the novels of A. C. Baantjer. The film won the Golden Film award two weeks later after having sold 100,000 tickets.

He also directed a 2023 episode of the Van der Valk television series.

Personal life 

Toonen married Birgit Schuurman in July 2008. They divorced in February 2019. Schuurman also played roles in several films directed by Toonen. They have a son.

Selected filmography 

 2010: Dik Trom
 2012: Black Out
 2015: The Little Gangster (De Boskampi's)
 2019: Amsterdam Vice (Baantjer: Het Begin)

References

External links 
 

1975 births
Living people
Dutch film directors
People from Boxmeer
21st-century Dutch people